Mitchell Gordon (born June 12, 1996) is a Canadian former competitive figure skater. He won the junior men's title at the 2012 Canadian Championships and qualified to the final segment at the 2013 World Junior Championships, where he finished 16th. He represented the Connaught Skating Club in Richmond, British Columbia. His coaches included Joanne McLeod, Neil Wilson, Eileen Murphy, and Keegan Murphy.

Programs

Competitive highlights 
CS: Challenger Series; JGP: Junior Grand Prix

References

External links 
 

1996 births
Canadian male single skaters
Living people
Figure skaters from Vancouver
20th-century Canadian people
21st-century Canadian people